Hallym Polytechnic University is a college located in Chuncheon, South Korea.

References

External links

Chuncheon
Private universities and colleges in South Korea
Universities and colleges in Gangwon Province, South Korea
Educational institutions established in 1939
1939 establishments in Korea